David Prowse MBE (1935–2020) was an English bodybuilder, weightlifter, Darth Vader actor in Star Wars and the Green Cross Man.

David Prowse  may also refer to:

 David Prowse (politician) (born 1941), the first Speaker of the Australian Capital Territory  Legislative Assembly
 David Prowse, a Canadian musician, drummer and vocalist for rock band Japandroids